Ladas can be:

Ladas (automobile), English car built in 1906
Ladas (horse), winner of the 1894 Epsom Derby
Ladas, Messenia, a village in Messenia, Greece
L.A.D.A.S., a locomotive of the Snowdon Mountain Railway that was destroyed in an accident on the railway's opening day

People named Ladas 
Ladas of Argos, Greek runner, winner of dolichos at the Olympic Games 460 BC
Ladas of Aegium, Greek runner, winner of the stadion race at the Olympic Games 280 BC
Georgios Ladas, Cypriot politician
Ioannis Ladas, Greek dictator

See also
Lada (disambiguation)